A Family Christmas is the fourth studio album by American musical group The Piano Guys. Released on October 22, 2013 by Portrait (a division of Sony Masterworks), the album reached number 20 on the US Billboard 200. On October 7, 2014 the album was re-released with two additional tracks in two different limited edition versions, one containing a miniature piano Christmas ornament, and the other a miniature cello Christmas ornament.

Track listing

Personnel
The Piano Guys
Steven Sharp Nelson - Cellist/Songwriter
Jon Schmidt - Pianist/Songwriter
Al van der Beek - Music Producer/Songwriter
Paul Anderson - Video Producer/Videographer

Charts

Weekly charts

Year-end charts

References 

2013 classical albums
Sony Music Christmas albums
The Piano Guys albums
2013 Christmas albums
Christmas albums by American artists
Pop Christmas albums
Classical Christmas albums